Plessur District is a former administrative district in the canton of Graubünden, Switzerland. The former district is named after the river Plessur which crosses it. However, the region along the Plessur –and therefore the whole valley–is called Schanfigg. It was replaced with the Plessur Region on 1 January 2017 as part of a reorganization of the Canton.

Plessur District consisted of three Kreise (sub-districts) Chur, Churwalden and Schanfigg, which are formed from a total of twelve municipalities:

 Includes the area of Malix and Parpan which merged into Churwalden on 1 January 2010.

 Includes the area of Calfreisen, Castiel, Langwies, Lüen, Molinis, Peist and St. Peter-Pagig which merged into Arosa in 2013.

Mergers
On 1 January 2010 the municipalities of Malix and Parpan merged into the municipality of Churwalden.
On 1 January 2013 the former municipalities of Calfreisen, Castiel, Langwies, Lüen, Molinis, Peist and St. Peter-Pagig merged into the municipality of Arosa.

Languages

See also
Araschgen

References

Districts of Graubünden
Alpine Rhine basin